The Hamilton Steelers were a soccer team in Hamilton, Ontario, Canada. The team was known as Hamilton Italo-Canadian Soccer Club from 1958 to 1960 when they played in the National Soccer League, then switched their name to the Steelers in 1961 when they joined the Eastern Canada Professional Soccer League. According to the Hamilton Spectator, the club was "incorporated in 1959 and capitalized at $200,000 with common shares bearing a par value of $1." In 1961, major shareholders were John Agro and Arnold Martini.

In November 1964, Primo Polianato took over as the club's major shareholder and subsequently renamed the club Primo Hamilton Soccer Club. The club remained in the Eastern Canada Professional Soccer League through 1966, then rejoined the National Soccer League in 1967 after the amalgamation of the two leagues.

Year-by-year

Coaches
 Hugh McLean

See also
Hamilton Steelers (1986–1992)

External links
 The pros brought promise that never came to fruition
 ECPSL RSSF
 NSL RSSF

References

 CBC Radio Clip

Defunct soccer clubs in Canada
Eastern Canada Professional Soccer League teams
Soccer clubs in Hamilton, Ontario
1958 establishments in Ontario
Association football clubs established in 1958
Canadian National Soccer League teams